Punctozotroctes feuilleti is a species of beetle in the family Cerambycidae. It was described by Tavakilian and Neouze in 2007.

References

Acanthoderini
Beetles described in 2007